Jafarabad (also Romanized as Ja‘farābād; also known as Ja‘farīyeh and Ja‘fariyeh Shahbad) is a village in Barakuh Rural District, Jolgeh-e Mazhan District, Khusf County, South Khorasan Province, Iran. At the 2006 census, its population was 5, in 4 families.

References 

Populated places in Khusf County